Pembroke Academy is a public secondary school in Pembroke, New Hampshire.

History
Pembroke Academy was incorporated on June 25, 1818, as a private school, and on May 25, 1819, the first building was dedicated. The academy opened with 48 students on May 26, 1819, and the first headmaster was Reverend Amos Burnham. In its early years Pembroke Academy prepared many students for attendance at Dartmouth College.

School profile

Today the school is public and takes students from Pembroke and from the neighboring towns of Allenstown, Epsom, Chichester, and historically, Deerfield.
Students from several other towns are also accepted on a memorandum of understanding. With approximately 850 students, the school competes in Division II in athletics by the NHIAA for most sports. The school's mascot is the Spartan.

Notable alumni  

 William E. Chandler, U.S. senator, Secretary of the Navy
 Charles Carleton Coffin, journalist, author
 David M. Cote, CEO, Honeywell International
 Byron M. Cutcheon, Civil War general, U.S. congressman
 Mary Baker Eddy, founder of Christian Science denomination
 Oscar Lapham, U.S. congressman
 Henry F. C. Nichols, Wisconsin assemblyman
 John B. Sanborn, Civil War general
 Charles H. Bell, 38th Governor of New Hampshire

References

External links
 
 Pembroke Academy official website
 City-Data.com
 GreatSchools
	
	

Schools in Merrimack County, New Hampshire
Educational institutions established in 1818
Public high schools in New Hampshire
Pembroke, New Hampshire